Gornac is a commune in the Gironde department in southwestern France.

Population

See also
Communes of the Gironde department

References

External links

Communes of Gironde